Hornbæk station is a railway station serving the seaside resort town of Hornbæk on the north coast of North Zealand, Denmark.

The station is located on the Hornbæk Line from Helsingør to Gilleleje. The train services are currently operated by the railway company Lokaltog which runs frequent local train services between Helsingør station and Gilleleje station.

History 

The station opened on 22 May 1906 to serve as terminus of the new railway line from Helsingør along the coast of the Øresund to Hornbæk. It caused the town to be invaded by tourists. In 1916, the railway was continued from Hornbæk station onwards along the coast to Gilleleje.

See also
 List of railway stations in Denmark

External links

Lokaltog

Railway stations in the Capital Region of Denmark
Railway stations opened in 1906
1906 establishments in Denmark
Railway stations in Denmark opened in the 20th century